is a Japanese male volleyball player. He was a part of the Japan men's national volleyball team. On club level he plays for Sakai Blazers.

References

External links
 profile at FIVB.org

1991 births
Living people
Japanese men's volleyball players
Place of birth missing (living people)
Asian Games medalists in volleyball
Volleyball players at the 2014 Asian Games
Volleyball players at the 2018 Asian Games
Universiade medalists in volleyball
Medalists at the 2014 Asian Games
Asian Games silver medalists for Japan
Universiade bronze medalists for Japan
Medalists at the 2013 Summer Universiade
21st-century Japanese people